Trachischium fuscum, also known as the blackbelly worm-eating snake or the Darjeeling slender snake, is a species of colubrid snake, which is endemic to Asia. The specific name, fuscum, is Latin for "dusky" or "dark brown".

Geographic range
It is found in Nepal and India (Jammu & Kashmir, northern West Bengal, Uttarakhand, Sikkim, Assam, eastern Arunachal Pradesh), possibly also in Bhutan.

Description
As the common name implies, the venter is black or dark brown. The dorsum is also black or dark brown, and may have lighter longitudinal streaks. The dorsal scales are in 13 rows. Males have keeled scales on their sides in the anal region.  Adults may attain 51 cm (20 inches) in total length, with a tail 6 cm (2¼ inches) long.

References

Further reading
 Blyth, Edward. 1855. Notices and descriptions of various reptiles, new or little known [part 2]. Jour. Asiatic Soc. Bengal, Calcutta, 23 (3): 287-302 [1854].

Trachischium
Snakes of Asia
Reptiles of India
Reptiles of Nepal
Taxa named by Edward Blyth
Reptiles described in 1854